Bainella is an extinct genus of Devonian trilobites from off the coast of Gondwana. Fossils were found in the Ponta Grossa Formation of Brazil, Belén, Icla and Gamoneda Formations of Bolivia and the Gydo, Gamka and Voorstehoek Formations of South Africa. It contains three species: B. africana, B. baini, and B. cristagalli.

References 

Calmoniidae
Phacopida genera
Devonian trilobites of Africa
Fossils of South Africa
Devonian trilobites of South America
Devonian Bolivia
Fossils of Bolivia
Devonian Brazil
Fossils of Brazil
Paraná Basin
Fossil taxa described in 1930